Scania simillima is a moth of the family Noctuidae. It is found in the Magallanes and Antartica Chilena Region of Chile and Neuquén, San Martín de los Andes and Bariloche in Argentina.

The wingspan is 33–35 mm. Adults are on wing from January to February.

External links
 Noctuinae of Chile

Noctuinae
Fauna of Argentina
Fauna of Chile
Moths of South America
Insects of South America